La Gacilly is a commune in the Morbihan department of Brittany in north-western France. It extended on 1 January 2017 by merging with former communes of La Chapelle-Gaceline and Glénac.

La Gacilly is best known as the location of worldwide cosmetics company Yves Rocher. It was established in 1959 by a local, Yves Rocher, who also served as the mayor of La Gacilly from 1962 to 2008, when his son Jacques Rocher was elected to the office.

The Yves Rocher La Gacilly Botanical Garden is located in the commune and is accessible to the public.

The "Festival Photo de La Gacilly" is an annual event usually taking place since 2004 between the months of June and October, during which some streets and the Botanical Garden are decorated with photographies from professionals from all over the world. The theme for the 2022 one is "Oriental Visions".

Demographics
Inhabitants of La Gacilly are called in French Gaciliens.

Twin towns — sister cities
La Gacilly is twinned with:
 Diapaga, Burkina Faso
 Gowerton, Wales, United Kingdom
 Hollersbach im Pinzgau, Austria

Gallery

See also
Communes of the Morbihan department

References

External links

 
Official tourist site of La Gacilly area 
Mayors of Morbihan Association 

Communes of Morbihan

Communes nouvelles of Morbihan